Marjorie "Mary" E Richards was an English cricketer who played primarily as a batter. She appeared in three Test matches for England in 1935. She played domestic cricket for West of England and Kent.

References

External links
 
 
Photo from the National Library of Australia

England women Test cricketers
West women cricketers
Kent women cricketers
Possibly living people
Year of birth missing
Place of birth missing